Classical music generally refers to the art music of the Western world, considered to be distinct from Western folk music or popular music traditions

Classical music may also refer to:

 Classical period (music)
 Classical Music (magazine)
 Classical music blog
 For other traditions see list of classical and art music traditions

By country
 Australian classical music
 Classical music of Birmingham
 Italian classical music
 Russian classical music
 Classical music in Kosovo
 Classical music in Scotland
 Classical music of the United Kingdom
 Classical music of the United States

Non-Western traditions
 List of classical and art music traditions
 Andalusian classical music
 Byzantine music
 Indian classical music
 Gagaku
 Ottoman music
 Persian traditional music
 Yayue

See also
 Art music
 List of classical music concerts with an unruly audience response